Usolye is the name of several inhabited localities in Russia.  The name is an archaic Russian term for a salt-producing locality.

Urban localities
Usolye, Usolsky District, Perm Krai, a town in Usolsky District of Perm Krai
Usolye, old name of Solvychegodsk
Old name of Usolye-Sibirskoye, a town in Usolsky District of Irkutsk Oblast
Rural localities
Usolye, Kirov Oblast, a village in Slobodskoy District of Kirov Oblast
Usolye, Okhansky District, Perm Krai, a village in Okhansky District of Perm Krai

See also
Usolye prison camp, a Gulag camp